Cave girl or Cavegirl may refer to 

 Cave Girl (comics), a 1950s comic-book character
 The Cave Girl, a 1913 novel by Edgar Rice Burroughs
 The Cave Girl (film) a 1921 film
 Cavegirl, a British TV series
 Cavegirl (film), a 1985 film
 Cave Girl, a 2008 album by The Texreys fronted by Brendan Kibble
 Cave-Girl, a 2013 book of poetry by Mary Elizabeth Parker
 Cavegirls, nickname of the female athletic teams of Carlsbad High School (Carlsbad, New Mexico)

See also
 Cavewoman, a comic-book character created in the 1990s
 Jungle Girl (disambiguation)